Rider of the Law is a 1919 American Western film directed by John Ford and featuring Harry Carey. The film is considered to be lost.

Cast
 Harry Carey as Jim Kyneton
 Vester Pegg as Nick Kyneton (as Vesta Pegg)
 Ted Brooks as The Kid
 Joe Harris as Buck Soutar
 Jack Woods as Jack West
 Duke R. Lee as Captain Saltire (as Duke Lee)
 Gloria Hope as Betty
 Claire Anderson as Roseen
 Jennie Lee as Jim's Mother

See also
 Harry Carey filmography
 List of lost films

References

External links
 
 Rider of the Law at SilentEra

1919 films
1919 Western (genre) films
American black-and-white films
Films directed by John Ford
Lost Western (genre) films
Universal Pictures films
Lost American films
1919 lost films
Silent American Western (genre) films
1910s American films